Rhamnoneuron balansae is a species of small tree belonging to the family Thymelaeaceae; it is the only species in the genus Rhamnoneuron.  It is native to southeastern Yunnan and northern Vietnam.  In Bac Ninh province, its bast is harvested to make dó paper.

Description
The shrub or small tree that grows to between 2 and 4 m tall. Its branchlets are erect, brown, and slender. It is often found in forests at altitudes of 900 to 1200 m.

References

Thymelaeoideae
Monotypic Malvales genera